Joshua Felix Okpoda Eppiah (born 11 October 1998) is a Belgian professional footballer who plays for Northampton Town on loan from Leicester City.

Playing career
Eppiah made his professional debut for OH Leuven on 23 November 2020 in the home match against Sint-Truiden. Eppiah was subbed in on the hour mark to replace Olivier Myny, scored after 73 minutes to put OH Leuven in the lead 2-1, but made a defensive error just five minutes before time resulting in Sint-Truiden scoring the equaliser.

On 28 January 2022, League Two club Northampton Town on loan until the end of the 2021–22 season.

International career
Eppiah was born in Belgium and is of Nigerian descent. He is a youth international for Belgium.

Career statistics

References

External links

1998 births
Living people
Belgian footballers
Belgium youth international footballers
Black Belgian sportspeople
Belgian people of Nigerian descent
Association football forwards
Leicester City F.C. players
Oud-Heverlee Leuven players
Northampton Town F.C. players
Belgian Pro League players
Belgian expatriate footballers
Expatriate footballers in England
Belgian expatriate sportspeople in England